Cross is a township on the Isle of Lewis in the community of Ness, in the Outer Hebrides, Scotland. Cross is within the parish of Barvas. Cross is also situated on the A857, between Stornoway and Port of Ness.

Cross had a school, which closed in 2011 and is now the Community Museum. The settlement also has a food store, a hotel-inn, war memorial, post office, two churches and Croileagan. Cross is home to around 100 people.

References

External links

Canmore - Lewis, Cross site record
Canmore - Lewis, Cross, Church of Scotland site record
Canmore - Lewis, Cross, Free Church site record
Canmore - Lewis, Cross, North Lewis War Memorial site record

Villages in the Isle of Lewis